This is a list of renamed places in Eswatini (Swaziland).

Country 

 Swaziland → Eswatini (2018)

Cities 
 Havelock Mine → Bulembu (1991)
 Bremersdorp → Manzini (1960)
 Buffelspruit → Mhlambanyatsi
 Goedgegun → Nhlangano

See also 
 Lists of renamed places
 List of city name changes

Geography of Eswatini
History of Eswatini
Eswatini
Eswatini, renamed places
Eswatini geography-related lists
Eswatini
Eswatini